Alan Fraser "Foo" Davies (25 September 1924 – 18 August 1987) was an Australian political scientist and author, known for his quip that Australians have a "talent for bureaucracy" and for his work on the relation between bureaucracy and public service. A professor at the University of Melbourne, Davies wrote a series of highly influential books on Australian politics.

Notable works 
 Australian Democracy: An Introduction to the Political System (1958)
 A Sunday Kind of Love (1961), a collection of short stories
 Australian Society: A Sociological Introduction (1965), edited with Sol Encel
 Private Politics: A Study of Five Political Outlooks (1966)
 Images of Class: An Australian Study (1967)
 Essays in Political Sociology (1972).
 Skills, Outlooks, and Passions: A Psychoanalytic Contribution to the Study of Politics (1980)
 The Human Element: Three Essays in Political Psychology (1988)

References 

1924 births
1987 deaths
Academic staff of the University of Melbourne
Australian political scientists
Writers from Victoria (Australia)
20th-century Australian writers
20th-century political scientists